The 2022–23 NIFL Premier Intermediate League (known as the Lough 41 Premier Intermediate League for sponsorship reasons) is the sixth season of the NIFL Premier Intermediate League, the third tier of the Northern Ireland Football League - the national football league in Northern Ireland. The season began on 20 August 2022.

Newington were the champions of the previous season and promoted to the 2022–23 NIFL Championship. They were replaced by Queen's University, who were relegated from the 2021–22 NIFL Championship. Ballymacash Rangers, champions of the 2021–22 Mid-Ulster Football League, defeated St James' Swifts, champions of the 2021–22 Ballymena & Provincial Football League, in a promotion playoff to earn promotion to the NIFL Premier Intermediate League, increasing the number of teams by one.

Teams

League table

Results

Matches 1–22
During matches 1–22 each team plays every other team twice (home and away).

Matches 23–27
For the final five matches, the table splits into two halves, with the top six teams forming Section A and the bottom six teams forming Section B. Each team plays every other team in their respective section once.

References

External links

Northern Ireland
2022–23 in Northern Ireland association football